The 2010 Missouri Valley Conference baseball tournament took place from May 25 through 29. All eight teams met in the double-elimination tournament held at Wichita State's Eck Stadium - Tyler Field in Wichita, Kansas. Illinois State won their second tournament championship and earned the conference's automatic bid to the 2010 NCAA Division I baseball tournament.

Seeding and format
The league's eight teams were seeded based on conference winning percentage. They then played a two bracket, double-elimination format tournament, with the winner of each bracket then playing a single elimination final.

Results

All-Tournament Team
The following players were named to the All-Tournament Team.

Most Outstanding Player
Illinois State second baseman Kevin Tokarski was named Most Outstanding Player.

References

Tournament
Missouri Valley Conference Baseball Tournament
Missouri Valley Conference baseball tournament
Missouri Valley Conference baseball tournament